The first elections to Bolton Metropolitan Borough Council were held on Thursday, 10 May 1973, with the entirety of the 69 seat council - three seats for each of the 23 wards - up for vote. It was the first council election as the newly formed metropolitan borough under a new constitution. The Local Government Act 1972 stipulated that the elected members were to shadow and eventually take over from the County Borough of Bolton, the Municipal Borough of Farnworth, the Urban Districts of Blackrod, Horwich, Kearsley, Little Lever, and Westhoughton, and the southern part of Turton Urban District on 1 April 1974. The order in which the councillors were elected dictated their term serving, with third-place candidates serving two years and up for re-election in 1975, second-placed three years expiring in 1976 and 1st-placed five years until 1978.

The Conservative Party took control of the new Council by a majority of 1. The Leader of the Council was Councillor John Hanscomb, who held this position until Labour took control in 1980.

Election result

Ward results

Astley Bridge ward

Bradshaw North and South ward

Bradford ward

Bromley Cross, Eagley and Egerton ward

Church East and North ward

Darcy Lever cum Breightmet ward

Deane cum Lostock ward

Derby ward

Farnworth North ward

Farnworth South ward

Great Lever ward

Halliwell ward

Heaton ward

Horwich North, Central and East ward

Horwich South and Blackrod ward

Hulton and Rumworth ward

Kearsley ward

Little Lever ward

Smithills ward

Tonge ward

West ward

Westhoughton East and Hulton ward

Westhoughton North, Central and South ward

References

 

1973
1973 English local elections
1970s in Lancashire